Last Hero ( Poslednij geroj) is the Russian version of the American reality show Survivor.

The title of the Russian version of the show was suggested by Sergei Suponev. It premiered on 17 November 2001 on Channel One Russia. The first six seasons of the show were being aired on Channel One since November 2001 until March 2009. Since 2019 the show is being aired on TV-3.

Seasons
 Last Hero 1
 Last Hero 2
 Last Hero 3
 Last Hero 4: End Game
 Last Hero 5: Super Game
 Last Hero 6: Heart of Africa
 Last Hero 7: Lost in Paradise

References

Russia
2001 Russian television series debuts
 
2000s Russian television series
Channel One Russia original programming